Ambohimahavelona is a town and commune in Madagascar. It belongs to the district of Toliara II, which is a part of Atsimo-Andrefana Region. The population of the commune was estimated to be 13,000 in a 2001 commune census.

Primary and junior level secondary education are available in town. The majority (80%) of the population of the commune are farmers, while an additional 5% receive their livelihood from raising livestock. The most important crops are maize and rice, while other important agricultural products are sugarcane and tomato.  Services provide employment for 15% of the population.

References and notes 

Populated places in Atsimo-Andrefana